José Fernando Cuadrado Romero (born 1 June 1985) is a Colombian professional footballer who last played as a goalkeeper for Atlético Nacional.

Career
In 2018, he was named in Colombia's 23-man squad for the World Cup in Russia.

Career statistics

International

Honours
Deportivo Cali
Copa Colombia: 2010

Deportivo Pasto
Categoría Primera B: 2011

See also
List of goalscoring goalkeepers

References

External links

1985 births
Living people
People from Valledupar
Colombian footballers
Colombia international footballers
Association football goalkeepers
Deportivo Cali footballers
Millonarios F.C. players
Deportivo Pasto footballers
Once Caldas footballers
Atlético Nacional footballers
Categoría Primera A players
Categoría Primera B players
2018 FIFA World Cup players
Colombian people of African descent